Jaxson Stauber (born April 27, 1999) is an American professional ice hockey goaltender for the Rockford IceHogs of the American Hockey League (AHL) while under contract with the Chicago Blackhawks of the National Hockey League (NHL).

Playing career
Stauber played for the Sioux Falls Stampede of the United States Hockey League (USHL) from 2017 until 2019 when he committed to play for the Minnesota State University, Mankato. He played one game with Minnesota State and the returned to Stampede on November 26, 2019. On February 9, 2020, Stauber committed to play for Providence College. 

After two seasons with Providence College, Stauber opted to turn professional and on March 23, 2022, signed a two-year, entry-level contract with the Chicago Blackhawks. In his NHL debut on January 21, 2023, Stauber made 29 saves in the Blackhawks' 5–3 win over the St. Louis Blues. Stauber would become the first Blackhawks goaltender to start his NHL career with a 3–0–0 record following subsequent wins over the Calgary Flames and Arizona Coyotes.

Personal life
Stauber is the son of Robb Stauber who is a former NHL player.

Career statistics

Awards and honors

References

External links
 

1999 births
Living people
American ice hockey goaltenders
Chicago Blackhawks players
Ice hockey players from Minnesota
Minnesota State Mavericks men's ice hockey players
People from Wayzata, Minnesota
Providence Friars men's ice hockey players
Rockford IceHogs (AHL) players
Sioux Falls Stampede players
Undrafted National Hockey League players